Cornell Township is a civil township of Delta County in the U.S. state of Michigan.  The population was 593 at the 2010 census, up from 557 at the 2000 census.

Geography

Demographics
As of the census of 2000, there were 557 people, 217 households, and 172 families residing in the township.  The population density was 9.3 per square mile (3.6/km2).  There were 371 housing units at an average density of 6.2 per square mile (2.4/km2).  The racial makeup of the township was 98.56% White, 0.18% Native American, 0.36% Asian, and 0.90% from two or more races. Hispanic or Latino of any race were 1.44% of the population.

There were 217 households, out of which 26.7% had children under the age of 18 living with them, 72.8% were married couples living together, 3.2% had a female householder with no husband present, and 20.7% were non-families. 16.6% of all households were made up of individuals, and 3.2% had someone living alone who was 65 years of age or older.  The average household size was 2.56 and the average family size was 2.88.

In the township the population was spread out, with 22.6% under the age of 18, 5.0% from 18 to 24, 26.6% from 25 to 44, 33.0% from 45 to 64, and 12.7% who were 65 years of age or older.  The median age was 42 years. For every 100 females, there were 114.2 males.  For every 100 females age 18 and over, there were 112.3 males.

The median income for a household in the township was $41,528, and the median income for a family was $43,214. Males had a median income of $35,313 versus $21,875 for females. The per capita income for the township was $18,334.  About 6.8% of families and 5.9% of the population were below the poverty line, including 3.4% of those under age 18 and 5.4% of those age 65 or over.

References 

Townships in Delta County, Michigan
Townships in Michigan